Vogar is a small town in the southwest of Iceland. It is the seat of the municipality of Vogar (Sveitarfélagið Vogar).

Overview
The population of the municipality of Vogar is 1,161 as of 2011.

References

External links

Populated places in Southern Peninsula (Iceland)
Reykjanes